Galina Mikhailovna Popova (Russian: Галина Михайловна Попова; née Vinogradova on 2 June 1932) is a retired Russian track athlete. She competed in the 100 metres at the 1956 and 1964 Summer Olympics, but failed to reach the finals. In 1954 she equaled the European record over 100 m (11.5) four times, and in 1956 she set two world records in the long jump.

Popova took up athletics in 1951 and was a member of the Soviet national team between 1953 and 1964. After retiring from competitions in 1964 she worked at the Lesgaft University, where in 1971 she defended a PhD on "Gas exchange and oxygenation of arterial blood during muscular load of maximum intensity".

References

External links
 

1932 births
Living people
Athletes (track and field) at the 1956 Summer Olympics
Athletes (track and field) at the 1964 Summer Olympics
Soviet female sprinters
Olympic athletes of the Soviet Union
Universiade medalists in athletics (track and field)
Place of birth missing (living people)
Universiade silver medalists for the Soviet Union
Medalists at the 1961 Summer Universiade
Olympic female sprinters